Mount Zoar is a mountain located in the Catskill Mountains of New York northeast of Windham. Kate Hill is located east-southeast, Ginseng Mountain is located west-northwest, and Mount Hayden is located northwest of Mount Zoar.

References

Zoar
Zoar